Photon noise is the randomness in signal associated with photons arriving at a detector.  For a simple black body emitting on an absorber, the noise-equivalent power is given by

The first term is essentially shot noise whereas the second term is related to the bosonic character of photons, variously known as "Bose noise" or "wave noise".  At low occupation number, such as in the visible spectrum, the shot noise term dominates.  At high occupation number, however, typical of the radio spectrum, the Bose term dominates.

See also
 Hanbury Brown and Twiss effect
 Phonon noise

References

Further reading

Photons
Energy

Signal processing
Particle statistics
Photodetectors